Damier Erik Pitts (born December 3, 1989)  is an American professional basketball player for Grindavík of the Úrvalsdeild karla. He played college basketball for Marshall before starting his professional career in 2012. During his first professional season, he led the Icelandic top-tier Úrvalsdeild karla in scoring. In 2018, he won the Portuguese League Cup with S.L. Benfica.

College career
Pitts played for Marshall University from 2008 to 2012 and was named to the  All-Conference USA Third-Team after his senior year.

Professional career
Pitts started his professional career in the Icelandic Úrvalsdeild karla with KFÍ in 2012. He led the league in scoring with 33.5 points per game and was selected for the 2013 Icelandic All-Star game.

In October 2018, Pitts signed with Jászberényi KSE of the Nemzeti Bajnokság I/A, replacing Remon Nelson.

In January 2020, Pitts signed with KK Rabotnički of the Macedonian Basketball League.

In November 2022, Pitts returned to Iceland and signed with Grindavík.

The Basketball Tournament

In 2017, Pitts participated in The Basketball Tournament with team NC Prodigal Sons. Pitts led the team to a first round upset of Ole Hotty Toddy, a team of Ole Miss alumni. The team made it to the Sweet 16 before being beaten by Ram Nation, a team of VCU alumni. The Basketball Tournament is a $2 million winner-take-all tournament broadcast annually on ESPN.

References

External links
Profile on Eurobasket.com
Finnish stats at korisliiga.fi
Latvian statistics at basket.lv
Icelandic statistics at Icelandic Basketball Association
Marshall Thundering Herd bio

1989 births
Living people
American expatriate basketball people in Finland
American expatriate basketball people in Hungary
American expatriate basketball people in Iceland
American expatriate basketball people in Italy
American expatriate basketball people in Latvia
American expatriate basketball people in Portugal
American expatriate basketball people in Turkey
American men's basketball players
Basketball players from Charlotte, North Carolina
BK Valmiera players
BK Ventspils players
Grindavík men's basketball players
Jászberényi KSE players
Kataja BC players
Marshall Thundering Herd men's basketball players
Point guards
Roseto Sharks players
S.L. Benfica basketball players
Soproni KC players
Úrvalsdeild karla (basketball) players
Vestri men's basketball players